2012–13 EuroChallenge was the 9th edition of Europe's third-tier level transnational competition for men's professional basketball clubs.

Teams
32 teams will participate in EuroChallenge Regular Season:

 A total of 28 teams have already qualified directly to the 32-team regular season.
 Another 4 teams will earn their place at the group stage by winning a qualifying round.

Qualifying round
First leg will be played in September 25 and the second one in October 2. Team 1 plays the second leg at home.

Regular season

The Regular Season began on November 6 and finished on December 14, 2012.

Group A

Group B

Group C

Group D

Group E

Group F

Group G

Group H

Last 16

Starts on January 15, 2013

Group I

Group J

Group K

Group L

Quarter-finals
Quarter-finals were played in a best-of-three series. Matches dates were 12, 14 and 19 March. Team 1 played the first and the third game at home court.

Final Four

The Final Four was held in the Karşıyaka Arena at Izmir, Turkey.

Awards

Weekly MVP

Regular season

Last 16

Quarterfinals

Final Four MVP

Individual statistics

Points

Rebounds

Assists

See also
 2012–13 Eurocup Basketball

References

External links

 
2012
2012–13 in European basketball leagues